Stephen Joseph Walford (born 5 January 1958) is an English former football player and manager. He played as a defender for clubs such as Tottenham Hotspur, Arsenal, Norwich City, West Ham United, and West Bromwich Albion.

After his playing career, Walford has worked as a coach, often assisting Martin O'Neill.

Early life
Walford was born in Highgate, London.

Playing career
Walford began playing as a centre half. He started his footballing career at Tottenham Hotspur in 1974. At Spurs, he made only two appearances before being signed in 1977 by Arsenal to play under former Spurs manager Terry Neill in a deal worth £25,000. Walford went on to play as a substitute in Arsenal's victorious 1979 FA Cup Final side. All in all, he made 98 appearances and scored four goals for the Gunners altogether. In 1981, he moved to Norwich City for £175,000. Whilst with Norwich, he suffered relegation and thereafter saw them being promoted to the First Division.

After 108 appearances for Norwich, Walford moved on to West Ham United in 1983 for a fee of £160,000; he played 115 times for the Hammers over the next four years. Towards the end of his West Ham career, he had loan spells at Huddersfield Town, Gillingham, and West Bromwich Albion. He moved abroad to play for Lai Sun of Hong Kong in 1989 before returning to England to play for Wycombe Wanderers under Martin O'Neill the following year.

Coaching career 
After a brief spell at Wealdstone, Walford returned to Wycombe to become O'Neill's assistant, who he previously worked alongside at Norwich City, Leicester City, Celtic, Aston Villa, and Sunderland. On 5 November 2013, O'Neill became manager of the Republic of Ireland national football team, and so Walford joined up with his coaching staff. Walford left the Ireland coaching staff in late 2018 for personal reasons.

On 18 September 2015, he returned to club football after being appointed as the Assistant Manager to Neil Lennon at Bolton Wanderers, replacing Johan Mjallby who left for personal reasons. He lasted just seven months in his role at Bolton and on 14 April 2016 left the club along with Garry Parker following the club's relegation from the Championship.

Honours

Player
Arsenal
FA Cup: 1979

Coach
Leicester
Football League First Division Play-offs: 1995–96
League Cup: 1996-97, 1999-2000

Celtic
Scottish Premier League: 2000–01, 2001–02, 2003–04
Scottish Cup: 2000–01, 2003–04, 2004–05
Scottish League Cup: 2000–01

Further reading
Canary Citizens by Mark Davage, John Eastwood, Kevin Platt, published by Jarrold Publishing, (2001),

References

External links
Steve Walford Flown from the Nest

1958 births
Celtic F.C. non-playing staff
Living people
Footballers from Highgate
English footballers
Association football defenders
English Football League players
Tottenham Hotspur F.C. players
Arsenal F.C. players
Norwich City F.C. players
West Ham United F.C. players
Huddersfield Town A.F.C. players
Gillingham F.C. players
West Bromwich Albion F.C. players
Wycombe Wanderers F.C. players
Hong Kong First Division League players
Wealdstone F.C. players
Wycombe Wanderers F.C. non-playing staff
Norwich City F.C. non-playing staff
Leicester City F.C. non-playing staff
Aston Villa F.C. non-playing staff
Sunderland A.F.C. non-playing staff
Bolton Wanderers F.C. non-playing staff
FA Cup Final players